Tricia's garden eel (Heteroconger tricia) is an eel in the family Congridae (conger/garden eels). It was described by Peter Henry John Castle and John Ernest Randall in 1999. It is a marine, tropical eel which is known from Flores, Indonesia, in the eastern Indian Ocean.

References

Heteroconger
Taxa named by Peter Henry John Castle
Taxa named by John Ernest Randall
Fish described in 1999